Black Steel Futsal Club Papua is an Indonesian professional futsal club based in Manokwari, West Papua, Indonesia. The club plays in the Indonesia Pro Futsal League.

Sponsorship

Players

Current squad

Club honours

National competitions
Pro Futsal League
Champions: 2016, 2020
Runners-up: 2019, 2021

Regional competitions
AFF Futsal Club
Third place: 2016

References

External links 
 Official website

Futsal clubs in Indonesia
Sport in Papua (province)
Futsal clubs established in 2010
2010 establishments in Indonesia